New Writings in SF 19 is an anthology of science fiction short stories edited by John Carnell, the nineteenth volume in a series of thirty, of which he edited the first twenty-one. It was first published in hardcover by Dennis Dobson in 1971, followed by a paperback edition issued by Corgi the same year.

The book collects seven novelettes and short stories by various science fiction authors, with a foreword by Carnell.

Contents
"Foreword" (John Carnell)
"The Mind Prison" (Michael G. Coney)
"A Memory of Golden Sunshine" (Kenneth Bulmer)
"Critical Path" (David Coles)
"The Discontent Contingency" (Vincent King)
"Stoop to Conquer" (John Rackham)
"First Light on a Darkling Plain" (Joseph Green)
"Real-Time World" (Christopher Priest)

References

External links

1971 anthologies
19